Sam Field may refer to:
 Sam Field (baseball)
 Sam Field (footballer)